Fino is a surname. Notable people with the surname include:

Anna Fino, Italian mathematician
Bashkim Fino (1962–2021), Albanian politician, the 29th Prime Minister of Albania
Gabriel Fino Noriega (1966/67-2009), Honduras journalist
Paul A. Fino (1913–2009), American lawyer and politician

See also 
Mariano De Fino (born 1983), Uruguayan cyclist riding for Salto Nuevo
Fino (disambiguation)